A total lunar eclipse took place on Saturday, April 13, 1968, the first of two total eclipses in 1968, the second being on October 6, 1968.

More details
Penumbral Magnitude: 2.07253 (207.253%)

Umbral Magnitude: 1.11164 (111.164%)

Gamma: -0.41732

Epsilon: 0°25’24.96”

Greatest Eclipse = 1968 Apr 13 at 04:47:22.2 UTC

Ecliptic Opposition = 1968 Apr 13 at 04:51:39.2 UTC

Equatorial Opposition = 1968 Apr 13 at 05:09:48.0 UTC

Sun’s Equatorial Right Ascension = 1.439h

Sun’s Equatorial Declination = +9.06°

Sun’s Diameter = 1913.8 arcseconds

Sun’s Equatorial Horizontal Parallax = 17.6 arcseconds

Moon’s Equatorial Right Ascension = 13.426h

Moon’s Equatorial Declination = -9.44°

Moon’s Diameter = 1991.6 arcseconds

Moon’s Equatorial Horizontal Parallax = 7309.4 arcseconds

Earth’s Shadow’s Equatorial Right Ascension = 13.439h

Earth’s Shadow’s Equatorial Declination = -9.06°

Earth’s Penumbral Shadow’s Diameter = 9313.92 arcseconds

Earth’s Umbral Shadow’s Diameter = 5486.4 arcseconds

Saros 131 (31 of 72), Descending Node

Eclipse Contacts 

P1: 1968 Apr 13 (Sat) at 02:12:33.3 UTC

U1: 1968 Apr 13 (Sat) at 03:10:18.4 UTC

U2: 1968 Apr 13 (Sat) at 04:23:07.6 UTC

Greatest: 1968 Apr 13 (Sat) at 04:47:22.2 UTC

U3: 1968 Apr 13 (Sat) at 05:11:38.3 UTC

U4: 1968 Apr 13 (Sat) at 06:24:28.0 UTC

P4: 1968 Apr 13 (Sat) at 07:22:09.1 UTC

Eclipse Durations 
The total duration of the eclipse was 5 hours, 9 minutes and 35.8 seconds.

The duration of the partial phases was 2 hours, 25 minutes and 38.9 seconds.

The duration of totality was 48 minutes and 30.7 seconds.

Visibility
It was visible from North and South America, as well as Africa and western Europe.

Related lunar eclipses

Lunar year series

Saros series
It is the second total lunar eclipse of the series.

Inex series

Half-Saros cycle
A lunar eclipse will be preceded and followed by solar eclipses by 9 years and 5.5 days (a half saros). This lunar eclipse is related to two annular solar eclipses of Solar Saros 138.

See also
List of lunar eclipses
List of 20th-century lunar eclipses

Notes

External links

1968-04
1968 in science
April 1968 events